Matija Miketić (born 3 February 1996) is a Serbian footballer who plays as a midfielder or winger.

Career

As a youth player, Miketić joined the youth academy of Italian Serie A side Hellas Verona from the youth academy of Crvena zvezda, one of Serbia's most successful clubs.

Before the second half of 2015/16, he signed for Zavrč in Slovenia.

In 2018, he signed for Serbian second division team Sloboda (Užice) from Mačva in the Serbian top flight.

References

External links
 
 

Living people
1996 births
Serbian footballers
Serbia youth international footballers
Association football wingers
Association football midfielders
NK Zavrč players
Slovenian PrvaLiga players
FK Mačva Šabac players
Serbian SuperLiga players
Serbian First League players
FK Novi Pazar players
FK Sloboda Užice players
FK BSK Borča players
FK Proleter Novi Sad players
Serbian expatriate footballers
Serbian expatriate sportspeople in Italy
Serbian expatriate sportspeople in Slovenia
Expatriate footballers in Italy
Expatriate footballers in Slovenia
Footballers from Belgrade